Ernest Austin Stanislaus "Bill" Cody (1892 – 30 December 1968) was a rugby union player who represented Australia.

Cody, a flanker, was born in Melbourne, Victoria, the son of Johnathon Francis Cody and his wife, Pauline Mary (née O'Callaghan). He attended St. Patrick's College from 1901 to 1903. He claimed a total of 3 international rugby caps for Australia in 1913.

Cody later worked as a clerk. During the First World War, he enlisted in 1916 as a gunner in the Australian Imperial Force, and rose to the rank of lieutenant upon returning to Australia in 1919.

References

Published sources
 Howell, Max (2006) Born to Lead - Wallaby Test Captains (2005) Celebrity Books, New Zealand

1892 births
1968 deaths
Australian people of Irish descent
Australian rugby union players
Australia international rugby union players
Rugby union players from Melbourne
Rugby union flankers
Australian military personnel of World War I
Military personnel from Melbourne
People educated at St Patrick's College, Ballarat